Téléphone was a French rock band formed in 1976. Their first, self-titled album was released in 1977; by the end of the decade they were one of the biggest French rock bands around, opening shows for The Rolling Stones in Paris, Quebec, the United States and Japan. The band split in 1986 for personal reasons. They have sold around 10 million albums to date, a record still unbeaten for a French rock band.

Among their best-known songs are "Hygiaphone", "Métro c'est trop" ("Metro's Too Much"), "La bombe humaine" ("Human bomb"), "Argent trop cher" ("Money Too Expensive"), "Ça c'est vraiment toi" ("That Is So You"), "Cendrillon" ("Cinderella"), "New York avec toi" ("New York City With You") and "Un autre Monde" ("Another World").

Members
Jean-Louis Aubert - guitar, piano, vocals
Louis Bertignac - guitar, vocals
Richard Kolinka - drums
Corine Marienneau - bass, piano, vocals

Reformation as "Les Insus" (2015-2017)

The band reunited briefly for a concert at the Point Éphémère on 11 September 2015 under the name "Les Insus" (insupportables, meaning insufferable. The elided name also suggests the word portable, meaning "cellphone" in French, thus implying an upgrade to modern times). Les Insus were composed of Aubert, Bertignac and Kolinka but with the bassist Corine Marienneau replaced on the bass guitar by Aleksander Angelov (hence the reason they were not able to use the name "Téléphone"). Another concert was given in Lille on 15 September. Les Insus also gave a concert in Lyon, at Le Transbordeur, on 6 October 2015. On 29 November 2015 the new group announced a real tour in France (in which Corine Marienneau would not participate) for 2016. The tour was scheduled from 27 April to 11 November in several major cities and several festivals. On 12 November, they announced a tour of the festivals in summer 2017 and a final gig at the Stade de France on 15 September. The live album Les Insus Live was released on 8 September.

Discography

Studio albums
Téléphone (1977) - peaked in FRA at #2
Crache Ton Venin (1979) - peaked in FRA at #2
Au Cœur de la Nuit (1980) - peaked in FA at #3
Dure Limite (1982) - peaked in FRA at #1
Un autre monde (1984), featuring John Entwistle of The Who - peaked in FRA at #2

Live albums

Les Insus
2017: Les Insus - Hygiaphone (Live 2017)

Compilation albums

DVDs
1980: Téléphone Public

Singles

2012: "Ça (C'est vraiment toi)" (re-release) - peaked in FRA at #133

Awards
Album Un autre monde won French awards "Victoire de la musique Album Rock" in 1985.

References

External links
Téléphone official site

Musical groups established in 1976
French rock music groups
Pathé-Marconi artists
Musical groups from Paris